Milawa is a town in Victoria, Australia, located on Snow Road,  south-east of Wangaratta, in the Rural City of Wangaratta. It is at the northern end of the King Valley wine region, between the King River to the west and Ovens River to the north (they meet in Wangaratta).

Milawa is the hub of the Milawa Gourmet Region which offers a wide range of produce.

The town is the home to the Brown Brothers vineyards, which have operated in the town since 1889. Milawa is also home to the Milawa Cheese Company and Milawa Mustards.

History
Milawa was named in 1874 after being known only as The Square for many years prior. The word Milawa is aboriginal in origin. The word is made up of the words 'Mila' meaning 'Eyes' and 'Wah/Wa' meaning water. The Bpangerang people in the Milawa area were the water watchers who kept a close eye on the two main rivers, the King River (the Poodumbia) and the Ovens (the Torryong).

In these early times the Emu Hotel occupied one corner (built by James Henley) and the Commercial was on the opposite corner (built by Colin Gardner). General merchandise was available at McKenzie's store and there were two blacksmiths, a saddler, a bootmaker, a carpenter and a doctor, Dr McSweeney.  (Milawa mustards now occupies the Emu Hotel site, the Milawa Hotel occupies the Commercial Hotel site and Food on Wood the McKenzies site). The Post Office opened on 7 July 1862, known as Oxley until 1870 and Oxley Plains until 1874.

A Mechanics Institute comprising a free library and a spacious hall opened in 1889.  A court was established in Milawa in 1874 by the visiting Magistrate Mr Howitt, in a room leased from the Emu Hotel.  The police station was located at the Commercial Hotel and in 1917 moved to McKenzies store upon becoming vacant.  The lock-up adjoined the Emu Hotel.

A dairy company was established in 1891 and by 1896 was one of the biggest dairy companies in Australia (the Milawa Cheese Company now occupies this site)

Football and cricket began to be played on an organised basis in the 1890s.

Milawa was connected to electricity from the Kiewa hydro scheme in 1939.

A violent storm cut a narrow path through Milawa in 1977 and destroyed the Anglican church, tore the roofs from many buildings and destroyed crops.  A second storm in 2000 followed a very similar path with similar results.

Source: Memories of Oxley, Graham Jones (1995).

Attractions
 Milawa Gourmet Region
 Brown Brothers has been established in Milawa since 1889 and is well known for its wide range of wines exported to many countries.
 The Milawa Cheese Company complex offers cheese tasting, a bakery, a restaurant, an ice creamery and an art gallery.
 Milawa Mustards offers mustard tasting and sales and has an art gallery.
 The Olive Shop
 The General Store
 Whiteheads Meadery & Honey
 Cottonwoods Farmgate

Food
Lindenwarrah offers restaurant Merlot.
Milawa Lodge offers Coopers Restaurant.
Brown Brothers offers Patricia's Table, an à la carte restaurant, and a relaxed food and wine venue, Epi.Curious.
The Milawa Cheese Company offers a Bakery and Restaurant.
 Food on Wood is on the central corner
 The Milawa Hotel is also on the corner.

Sport
 The town has an Australian Rules football team competing in the Ovens & King Football League.
 Squash: There are three squash courts at Milawa and a number of competitions running throughout the year.
 Tennis
 Netball

References

Towns in Victoria (Australia)
Rural City of Wangaratta